Loheria is a genus of flowering plants belonging to the family Primulaceae.

It is native to New Guinea and the Philippines.

The genus name of Loheria is in honour of August Loher (1874–1930), German pharmacist and botanist. 
It was first described and published in Philipp. J. Sci., C Vol.5 on page 373 in 1910.

Known species
According to Kew:
Loheria bracteata 
Loheria crassifolia 
Loheria jubilaria 
Loheria papuana 
Loheria porteana 
Loheria reiniana

References

Primulaceae
Primulaceae genera
Plants described in 1910
Flora of New Guinea
Flora of the Philippines